Star FM may refer to:

 Star FM (Australia), a former radio network in Australia
 Star FM (Kenya), a Somali-language radio station
 Star FM (Philippines), a radio network in the Philippines
 Star FM (South Africa), a radio station in Klerksdorp, South Africa
 Star FM Zimbabwe, a national radio station in Zimbabwe

See also
 List of radio stations named Star